Salinas (Spanish for "Salt Marsh or Salt Flats") is a city in California and the county seat of Monterey County. With a population of 163,542 in the 2020 Census, Salinas is the most populous city in Monterey County.

Salinas serves as the main business, governmental, and industrial center of the region. The marine climate is ideal for the floral industry, grape vineyards, and vegetable growers. Salinas is known as the "Salad Bowl of the World" for its large, vibrant agriculture industry.

It was the hometown of writer and Nobel laureate John Steinbeck (1902–68), who set many of his stories in the Salinas Valley and Monterey. Salinas has a high Hispanic proportion, which at 79.6%, is the highest proportion of Hispanic Americans out of any city in California, and 8th largest overall in the nation. The city also has a sizable Asian-American population, with a large and historic Filipino population. The city once also had the 2nd biggest Chinatown in the nation behind only San Francisco.

History

The land that Salinas sits on is thought to have been settled by Native Americans known as the Esselen prior to 200 AD. Between 200 and 500 AD, they were displaced by the Rumsen group of Ohlone speaking people.  The Rumsen-Ohlone remained as the inhabitants of the area for approximately another 1,200 years, and in the 1700s, were the group of native inhabitants contacted and recorded by the first Spanish explorers of the Salinas area.

Upon the arrival of the Spanish, large Spanish land grants were initially issued for the Catholic Missions and also as bonuses to soldiers.  Later on after Mexican independence, smaller land grants continued to be issued for ranchos where mostly cattle were grazed.  One of the many land grants was the Rancho Las Salinas land grant, part of which included the area of modern-day Salinas.  As a result of the many new cattle ranches, a thriving trade eventually developed in cattle hide shipments, shipping primarily out of the Port of Monterey.

In 1848 California officially became a part of the United States of America. This transition followed several years of battles in the Salinas area with John Fremont flying the American flag on the highest peak of the Gabilan Mountains and claiming California for the United States. Before the transition to American administration, Monterey had been the capital of California.  For a short while after the transition, California was ruled by martial law.  On September 9, 1850, California was admitted to the Union and became a State, celebrated as California Admission Day.

In 1854, six years after becoming a part of the United States, a group of American settlers living in the vicinity of this route-junction opened a post office at the junction, naming their town "Salinas," apparently a reference to the original "Rancho Las Salinas" name for the area, which in turn was named in Spanish for the salt marshes of the area around the central Salinas slough, which was drained. Soon thereafter, in 1856, a traveler's inn called the Halfway House was opened at that junction in Salinas. (The nearby Salinas River, was apparently only later named by an American cartographer, after the nearest town of Salinas in 1858. Previously that river had gone by the name: "Rio de Monterey."). The streets of Salinas were laid out in 1867, and the town was incorporated in 1874.

The conversion of grazing land to crops and the coming of the rail road in 1868 to transport goods and people was a major turning point in the history and economic advancement of Salinas. Dry farming of wheat, barley, and other grains as well as potatoes and mustard seed was common in the 1800s. Chinese labor drained thousands of acres of swampland to become productive farmland, and as much early farm labor was done by Chinese immigrants, Salinas boasted the second largest Chinatown in the state, slightly smaller than San Francisco. Irrigation changed farming in Salinas to mainly row crops of root vegetables, grapes and sugar beets. Many major vegetable producers placed their headquarters in Salinas.  Driven by the profitable agricultural industry, Salinas had the highest per capita income of any city in the United States in 1924.

During World War II, the Salinas Rodeo Grounds was one of the locations used as a temporary detention camp for citizens and immigrant residents of Japanese ancestry, before they were relocated to more permanent and remote facilities. One of seventeen such sites overseen by the Wartime Civilian Control Administration, the Salinas Assembly Center was built after President Roosevelt issued Executive Order 9066, authorizing the removal and confinement of Japanese Americans living on the West Coast. The camp opened on April 27, 1942, and held a total of 3,608 people before closing two months later on July 4.

Following World War II major urban and suburban development converted much farmland to city. The city experienced two particularly strong growth spurts in the 1950s and 1960s, and again in the 1990s and early 2000s. Aerial photographic interpretation indicate such major conversion of cropland to urban uses over the time period 1956 to 1968, while the city annexed the adjacent communities of Alisal and Santa Rita during this time. The Harden Ranch, Creekbridge and Williams Ranch neighborhoods constituting much of the city's North-East were built almost exclusively between 1990 and 2004.

Salinas was also the birthplace of writer and Nobel Prize laureate John Steinbeck. The historic downtown, known as Oldtown Salinas, features much fine Victorian architecture, and is home to the National Steinbeck Center, the Steinbeck House and the John Steinbeck Library.

Major development took place in the 1990s, with the construction of Creekbridge, Williams Ranch, and Harden Ranch.

Geography

Prior to mass agricultural and urban development, much of the city consisted of rolling hills bisected by wooded creeks and interspersed with marsh land. Today, the city is located mostly on leveled ground, with some rolling hills and wooded gulches with creeks remaining in the north-eastern Creekbridge and Williams Ranch neighborhoods, as well as the Laurel Heights section of East Salinas. The natural ecosystems accompanying the area's topography and environment have been recreated in Natividad Creek Park and adjacent Upper Carr Lake.

The Gabilan and Santa Lucia mountain ranges border the Salinas Valley to the east and to the west, respectively.

The Salinas River runs the length of the Salinas Valley and empties into the Pacific Ocean at the center of the Monterey Bay. During the summer months the river flows partially underground and it is this extensive underground aquifer that allows for irrigation of cropland in an area without much annual rainfall.

Climate

Salinas has cool and moderate temperatures, due to the "natural air conditioner" that conveys ocean air and fog from the Monterey Bay to Salinas, while towns to the north and south of Salinas experience hotter summers, as mountains block the ocean air. Annually, there are an average of 5.8 days with + highs, and an average of 7.1 days with lows reaching the freezing mark or lower.

In 2015 Salinas was in the top ten American cities for cleanest air quality, It is thought that the offshore marine layer generates winds that blow smog further inland.

The difference between ocean and air temperature also tends to create heavy morning fog during the summer months, known as the marine layer, driven by an onshore wind created by the local high pressure sunny portions of the Salinas Valley, which extend north and south from Salinas and the Bay.

Occasionally, there is snowfall on the peaks of the Gabilan and Santa Lucia mountain ranges, but snow in the city itself is extremely rare, occurring about once every 5 to 15 years on average. An inch of snow fell in Salinas on February 26, 2011.

Demographics

2020
The 2020 United States census reported that Salinas had a population of 163,542. The racial makeup of Salinas was 32% white (12% for white alone, not Hispanic or Latino), 79% Hispanic or Latino, 1% African American, 6% Asian, 0.1% Native Hawaiian and other pacific Islander, 1% American Indian and Alaska native, 7% Two or more races. The median household income is $67,914, and the medium income per capita is $23,707. The poverty percentage is at 14%.

2010

The 2010 United States Census reported that Salinas had a population of 150,441. The racial makeup of Salinas was 68,973 (45.8%) White, down from 90.3% in 1970, 2,993 (2.0%) African American, 1,888 (1.3%) Native American, 9,438 (6.3%) Asian, 478 (0.3%) Pacific Islander, 59,041 (39.2%) from other races, and 7,630 (5.1%) from two or more races. Hispanic or Latino of any race were 112,799 persons (75.0%).

The Census reported that 147,976 people (98.4% of the population) lived in households, 658 (0.4%) lived in non-institutionalized group quarters, and 1,807 (1.2%) were institutionalized.

There were 40,387 households, out of which 21,435 (53.1%) had children under the age of 18 living in them, 21,380 (52.9%) were opposite-sex married couples living together, 6,835 (16.9%) had a female householder with no husband present, 3,300 (8.2%) had a male householder with no wife present. There were 3,271 (8.1%) unmarried opposite-sex partnerships, and 271 (0.7%) same-sex married couples or partnerships. 6,895 households (17.1%) were made up of individuals, and 2,587 (6.4%) had someone living alone who was 65 years of age or older. The average household size was 3.66. There were 31,515 families (78.0% of all households); the average family size was 4.05.

The population was spread out, with 47,180 people (31.4%) under the age of 18, 18,049 people (12.0%) aged 18 to 24, 44,978 people (29.9%) aged 25 to 44, 28,976 people (19.3%) aged 45 to 64, and 11,258 people (7.5%) who were 65 years of age or older. The median age was 28.8 years. For every 100 females, there were 102.1 males. For every 100 females age 18 and over, there were 100.8 males.

The homeowner vacancy rate was 2.5%; the rental vacancy rate was 4.6%. 65,108 people (43.3% of the population) lived in owner-occupied housing units and 82,868 people (55.1%) lived in rental housing units. The majority of residents were living in single-unit detached homes, built between 1950 and 2000, while one third of the housing stock had three or more units per structure.

2000
The 2000 United States Census reported that Salinas had a population of 151,060. The racial makeup of the city was 65.2% Hispanic or Latino of any race, 49.1% White, 6.2% Asian American, 3.3% African American, 1.3% Native American, 38.7% from other races, and 5.1% from two or more races. 49.2% had children under the age of 18 living with them, 57.6% were married couples living together, 14.8% had a female householder with no husband present, and 21.6% were non-families. 17.1% of all households were made up of individuals, and 6.5% had someone living alone who was 65 years of age or older. The average household size was 3.69 and the average family size was 4.08

Age distribution was 33.0% under the age of 19 or younger, 11.8% from 18 to 24, 33.7% from 25 to 44, 15.5% from 45 to 64, and 7.1% who were 65 years of age or older. The median age was 28 years. For every 100 females, there were 117.7 males. For every 102 females age 18 and over, there were 117.4 males.

The median household income was $43,728, and the median family income was $44,669. Males had a median income of $35,641 versus $27,013 for females. The per capita income for the city was $14,495. About 12.8% of families and 16.7% of the population were below the poverty line, including 20.1% of those under age 18 and 9.4% of those age 65 or over.

Median household income in the city tended to be significantly higher alongside the city limits, especially in the northern Harden Ranch and Creekbridge neighborhoods. East Salinas and the downtown area suffered from a very low median household income as well as high crime rates. South and North Salinas featured roughly the same level of median households income with the latter being home to city's wealthiest newly constructed neighborhoods.

Crime
Salinas has a significant, but declining problem with organized street gangs, such as Nortenos and Surenos, and associated violent crime. According to the U.S. Bureau of Justice Statistics, the city's overall violent crime and homicide rates are above those for California and the nation overall. However, the violent crime rate in Salinas has declined by almost 75 percent since 2015. The Salinas Police Department thinks that crimes rates are decreasing not because there’s less crimes committed but because there’s less crimes being reported. The Salinas City Council blames this because of Salinas PD staffing shortages. Gang activity and violent crime are focused in Central and East Salinas and exacerbated by the city's comparatively low tax base and consequently limited policing resources. A hypothesis to explain the city's particularly intense problem with gang related violent crime cites the city's proximity to Salinas Valley State Prison. The prison was an early launch pad for street operations of the notorious prison gang, Nuestra Familia. This in turn, is seen as having spawned a legacy of multi-generational gang membership among the poorer and less educated residents of East Salinas. In a depiction of crime and active policing within the city, since 2018, Salinas police officers have been shadowed by camera crews for broadcast on the TV show Live PD.

Economy

Major employers in Salinas include Taylor Farms, Tanimura & Antle, Salinas Valley Memorial Hospital, Natividad Hospital, Mann Packing, Hilltown Packing, Newstar Fresh Foods, Matsui Nursery and Monterey County.

Salinas is known for its AgTech industry, and is known as the emerging AgTech Capital of the nation and a global hub for agricultural technology. Its close proximity to Silicon Valley and large number of agricultural employers give forth to an ideal location for developing high tech agricultural innovations.

Forbes AgTech Summit
Since 2015, Forbes has hosted the yearly Forbes AgTech Summit in Salinas. The event draws agricultural technology entrepreneurs from around the world and includes speakers, group discussions, tours, on site demonstrations.

Arts and culture

Salinas has an emerging arts scene led by the First Fridays Art Walk and the innovative use of non-traditional or business venues to exhibit art and host live local music.The oldest gallery in Salinas, the Valley Art Gallery, has been active for over 30 years. The Hartnell College Gallery hosts world-class exhibitions of art during the school year. The National Steinbeck Center has two galleries with changing exhibits, and the city's newest @Risk Gallery features humdrum exhibitions. The Art Walk, held in the downtown area, features 50 venues.

Live theater companies in Salinas include ARIEL Theatrical located in the Karen Wilson's Children's Theater in Oldtown Salinas, and The Western Stage, based at Hartnell College.

Live local music is available at many restaurants in the downtown area, and during the First Fridays Art Walk. Concerts are held at the historic Fox California Theater, Steinbeck Institute for Arts and Culture and the Salinas Sports Complex, as well as at Hartnell College.

Salinas is home to many public murals, including work by John Cerney which can be viewed in the agricultural fields surrounding the city. Claes Oldenburg placed his sculpture, Hat in Three Stages of Landing, in Sherwood Park at the center of the city.

The city contains several art deco buildings, including the Monterey County Courthouse and the Salinas Californian Building.

Cultural events

El Grito
El Grito is a free annual event held every September in the Alisal Neighborhood of Salinas. The event draws up to 65,000 people and features a parade, performances, vendors, Mexican cuisine, and cultural exhibits. El Grito is a celebration of the beginning of the Mexican War of Independence.

Founders Day
Salinas Founders Day is an annual event held since 1869, that celebrates the history of Salinas. The 2017 event was held at the Salinas Train Station Plaza in downtown Salinas, and included tours of the First Mayor's House and the Monterey and Salinas Valley Railroad Museum, music, and historical talks.

Ciclovía Salinas

Ciclovía Salinas is an annual event that has taken place in the Alisal neighborhood of Salinas since 2013, and features a 1.5 mile stretch of Alisal Street that is closed off to automobiles, and exclusively for use of pedestrians, bicyclists, and other non-motorized forms of transportation. The goal of the event is to promote youth leadership, walking, biking, and other recreational activities that promote a healthy lifestyle.

The event is led entirely by Salinas youth volunteers and in 2018, it featured a 3-kilometer run, Cross Fit activities, soccer, zumba, boxing, community created murals, disc golf, folklorico dancing, and Oaxacan cultural dancing.

California Rodeo Salinas
As the host of a PRCA-sanctioned rodeo, Salinas is a major stop on the professional rodeo circuit. The California Rodeo Salinas began in 1911 as a Wild West Show on the site of the old race track ground, now the Salinas Sports Complex. Every third week of July is Big Week, when cowboys and fans come for the traditional rodeo competitions, including bull riding. Rodeo-related events held in Salinas and Monterey include cowboy poetry, wine tasting, a carnival, barbecues and a gala cowboy ball.

Kiddie Kapers Parade
The Kiddie Kapers Parade began in 1930 and is an annual parade with only children in costume, held in conjunction with "Big Week" and the annual Rodeo.

Salinas Asian Festival

The Salinas Asian Festival is a free annual event in Salinas held since 2009 that celebrates the culture and history of Chinese, Filipino, and Japanese immigrants in Salinas.  The Salinas Buddhist Temple, the Salinas Chinese Association, and the Filipino Cultural Center of Salinas are open to tour. The event includes food, demonstrations of tai chi, Filipino folk dancing, kendo, and a bonsai display. The 2017 festival the Salinas Chinatown Virtual Walking Tour.

Points of interest

John Steinbeck House

The John Steinbeck House was the birthplace and childhood home of author John Steinbeck, and is now home to a restaurant. The house was built in 1897 and is a Queen Anne style Victorian.

Boronda Adobe History Center
Just outside the official city limits, the restored adobe dwelling constructed in 1844 by José Eusebio Boronda, rests on one of the original Mexican land grants. The Boronda Adobe is a California Historical Landmark and listed in the National Register of Historic Places and holds a museum of early Salinas and California history. Other historic buildings are located here, including the Lagunita School house John Steinbeck wrote about in the Red Pony. The site also holds the official archive of Monterey County, open to researchers by appointment.

Santa Lucia Highlands American Viticultural Area
Santa Lucia Highlands AVA is nearby so the area is becoming a destination for wine tasting.

Education

School districts
Salinas has seven public school districts serving the city core and adjacent unincorporated areas. The largest school district in Salinas is the Salinas Union High School District (grades 7–12) with 13,578 students enrolled in 10 campuses. The Salinas City Elementary School District is the largest elementary school district in Salinas, with 13 schools and 7,954 students. Other districts include Santa Rita Union Elementary School District, Graves Elementary School District, Washington Union School District, Lagunita School District, and Alisal Union School District.

Private Catholic schools in the city include the all-boys Palma School and the all-girls Notre Dame High School.

Higher education
Hartnell College, as well as a satellite campus of California State University, Monterey Bay, are located in Salinas.

Media

Local newspapers include The Salinas Californian, Monterey County Weekly and Monterey County Herald.

Local radio stations include:
 KION/1460
 KTGE/1570
 KHDC/90.9
 KPRC-FM/100.7
 KDON-FM/102.5
 KRAY-FM/103.5
 KOCN/105.1
 KSQL/99.1
 KBRG/100.3
 KVVF/105.7

Television service for the community comes from the Monterey-Salinas-Santa Cruz designated market area (DMA). KSMS-TV Channel 67, KION-TV Channel 46 and KSBW Channel 8 provide news for the area as the area's Univision, CBS, NBC and ABC affiliates.

Infrastructure

Transportation

Highways and roads
U.S. Route 101 is the major north–south highway in Salinas, linking the city to the rest of the Central Coast region, San Francisco to the north, and Los Angeles to the south. California State Route 68 heads west to Monterey, while California State Route 183 runs northwest to Castroville.

Rail

Amtrak, the national passenger rail system, serves Salinas. Its Coast Starlight train runs daily in each direction between Seattle, Washington, and Los Angeles, stopping in Salinas.

The Salinas Rail extension aims to provide weekday rail service to Gilroy and San Jose Diridon station by 2024.

Bus
Public transportation via bus is provided by Monterey–Salinas Transit (MST). Public buses take passengers throughout the county, as well as San Jose and Gilroy. Buses to San Jose and Gilroy connect to Caltrain and Amtrak in those cities.

Greyhound operates from the Salinas Amtrak station with service to other California cities and throughout the United States.

Airport
Salinas Municipal Airport is located on the southeastern boundary of the City of Salinas, 3 miles (5 km) from the city center. It is a general aviation facility occupying , with two runways serving single and twin engine aircraft and helicopters, as well as an increasing number of turbopropeller and turbine-powered business jets.

The airport has an air traffic control tower in operation twelve hours a day, seven days a week. The airport terminal is located on Mortensen Avenue and houses airport office staff as well as professional offices. The city is currently accepting proposals for leasing and operation of the restaurant located within the Terminal. Salinas Airport Commissioners agreed to a proposed project that would bring a 100-room hotel, offices and hangars to a vacant lot in front of the Salinas Municipal Airport terminal. The Salinas Jet Center would include a national chain hotel,  of office space, four large complexes combining more offices with airplane hangars and a 24-hour, full-service aircraft fueling station. The project would also include a taxiway to allow planes to access the new hangars.

The airport has full Instrument Landing System (ILS) and VHF omnidirectional range (VOR) located on the airport. The ILS has a Medium Intensity Approach Lighting System, with Runway Alignment Indicator Lights. The VOR approach has Runway End Identifier Lights. All but the ILS runway, RWY 31, have Visual Approach Slope Indicators (VASIs).

The airport is the site of the California International Airshow, set annually in the late summer or early autumn. The event draws thousands of visitors to Salinas over its three-day run.

Hospitals
Salinas and its surrounding towns are served by Salinas Valley Memorial Hospital and Natividad Medical Center, both located in Salinas. Natividad is one of the University of California, San Francisco's teaching hospitals and is owned and operated by Monterey County. Salinas Valley Memorial Hospital and Healthcare System is a public district hospital run by an elected board of directors.

Natividad Medical Center, through its affiliated Natividad Medical Foundation, offers trained medical interpreters for speakers of several Oaxacan languages (including Triqui, Mixteco, and Zapotec) as well as Spanish.

Notable people

 Monica Abbott, 2008 Olympic softball pitcher
 Everett Alvarez Jr., U.S. Navy pilot and prisoner of war
 Jodi Arias, convicted murderer of Travis Alexander, was born in Salinas
 Dustin Lance Black, Academy Award-winning screenwriter
 Ernie Camacho, Major League Baseball pitcher
 Jose Celaya, boxer
 Doug Chandler, Hall of Fame motorcycle racer, Grand Slam winner, World Superbike champion
 Ramiro Corrales, former Major League Soccer defender with the San Jose Earthquakes
 Cordell Crockett, bass guitarist with band Ugly Kid Joe
 Chris Dalman, National Football League offensive lineman and coach
 Drew Dalman, National Football League offensive lineman with the Atlanta Falcons
 Harold Davis, athlete in National Track and Field Hall of Fame
Amy Díaz-Infante, visual artist and educator
 Evan Dietrich-Smith, Tampa Bay Buccaneers offensive lineman, Super Bowl XLV champion (2011 with Green Bay Packers), Salinas High School graduate, class of 2004
Nick Duron (born 1996), baseball pitcher in the San Francisco Giants organization
 David Esquer, head coach of the Stanford Cardinal baseball team, graduate of Palma High School
 David Estrada, UCLA soccer player (midfield, forward), drafted in first round (11th overall) of 2010 MLS SuperDraft by Seattle Sounders FC
 Verna Felton, actress
 Michael Gasperson, NFL wide receiver
 Susan Gerbic, skeptical activist
 Brandi Glanville, fashion model, television personality in The Real Housewives of Beverly Hills
 Jackie Greene, singer-songwriter and blues musician
 Sammy Hagar, singer, former member of Van Halen, now in bands Chickenfoot and Waboritas
 Alvin and Calvin Harrison, twins, 1996 Olympic track and field athletes
 Vanessa Hudgens, singer and actress, High School Musical
 Ernie Irvan, race car driver and winner of the 1991 Daytona 500
 Joe Kapp, quarterback for University of California, Berkeley in College Football Hall of Fame, 1969 NFL champion
 Marie D. Kassing, organization founder
 Slim Keith, socialite
 Craig Kilborn, television personality
 Rick Law, Disney artist and producer
 Howard H. Leach, businessman and diplomat
 Sacheen Littlefeather, Apache actress and activist for Native American rights.
 Herbert Mullin, serial killer
 Xavier Nady, Major League Baseball player, Salinas High School graduate, class of 1997
 Carl Nicks, offensive linemen, Super Bowl XLIV champion (2010), North Salinas High School graduate
 Kassim Osgood, National Football League wide receiver, Pro Bowl, North Salinas High School
 Van Partible, cartoonist, creator of Johnny Bravo
 Ernie Reyes Sr., American martial artist, actor and fight choreographer 
 Mike Rianda, writer and director of The Mitchells vs. the Machines
 Monty Roberts, horse tamer and author of The Man Who Listens to Horses
 Del Rodgers, NFL running back
 Gary Shipman, artist, comic book illustrator and creator of Pakkins' Land
 Brendon Small, actor, composer, musician, known as creator of the animated series Home Movies and Metalocalypse
 Edward Soriano, retired United States Army Lieutenant General
 Sam Spence, NFL Films composer
 John Steinbeck, author and Nobel laureate, author of The Grapes of Wrath and Of Mice and Men, among others
 Rita Taggart, actress
 Anthony Toney, NFL running back
 Sean D. Tucker, aerobatic stunt pilot
 Elliot Vallejo, NFL offensive lineman, Palma High School
 Cain Velasquez, UFC heavyweight champion, mixed martial arts fighter and former collegiate wrestler

In popular culture
 Marilyn Monroe, actress and Twentieth Century Fox starlet, was honored as the Diamond Queen of Salinas on February 20, 1948.
 Salinas is mentioned in various John Steinbeck novels, and is the setting of his monumental novel East of Eden.

Sister cities
Salinas' sister cities are:
Cebu City, Philippines (1964)
Ichikikushikino, Japan (1979)
Jerécuaro, Mexico (1996)
Guanajuato, Mexico (2007)
Drogheda, Ireland (2012)
Söke, Turkey (2015)
Seogwipo, South Korea (2018)

See also
 Salinas Valley
 Salinas lettuce strike of 1934
 United Farm Workers
 John Steinbeck
 List of U.S. cities with large Hispanic populations

References

Further reading

 Gálvez-Arango, Hannah, et al. "A Multifaceted Examination of Salinas, California." (2018) online.

 McKibben, Carol Lynn. Salinas: A History of Race and Resilience in an Agricultural City (Stanford University Press, 2022). online review

External links

 
 Salinas Chamber of Commerce

 
1874 establishments in California
Cities in Monterey County, California
County seats in California
Incorporated cities and towns in California
Populated places established in 1874
Salinas Valley